is an arcade racing game that was released by Namco in 1994 for their System 22 hardware. Despite its name, Ridge Racer 2 is more of an updated version of Ridge Racer (which had been released in the previous year), than an actual sequel.

Gameplay
The gameplay is very much like that of the original, but unlike the vanilla version of Ridge Racer (which was a single-player game), in Ridge Racer 2 up to eight players can play simultaneously when four two-player cabinets are linked together. A player's number determines their car.

There also are six new songs, including remixed ones from the original, that can be selected with the gear shifter at the start. The enormous television screen above the entrance to the first tunnel shows footage from Namco's 1979 title Galaxian (in the original, it was playing Mappy). All the billboards are for earlier Namco games, there is a rear-view mirror at the top of the screen, so a player can see other cars coming from behind). There is also a change in daylight from day to night (a car driven into the track's tunnel during the day will come out the other end at night).

Legacy
In 1995 Ridge Racer/Ridge Racer 2 was followed by two true sequels: an arcade sequel, named Rave Racer, which was developed for Namco's System 22 hardware and a home console sequel, named Ridge Racer Revolution, for the PlayStation (which inherited Ridge Racer 2's soundtrack).

Reception
In Japan, Game Machine listed Ridge Racer 2 on their August 15, 1994 issue as being the fourth most-successful upright/cockpit arcade game of the month. In North America, RePlay reported the game to be the fourth most-popular deluxe arcade game at the time. Play Meter also listed the title to be the thirty-seventh most-popular arcade game at the time. Next Generation reviewed the arcade version of the game, rating it four stars out of five, and stated that "eight-user multi-player link-up has been added to enable Ridge Racer 2 to compete on equal footing with Sega's Daytona USA and Namco's new Ace Driver."

References

Notes

Footnotes

External links

Ridge Racer 2 at the Arcade History database

1994 video games
Arcade video games
Arcade-only video games
Namco arcade games
Namco System 22 games
Racing video games
Ridge Racer
Video games developed in Japan
Video games scored by Shinji Hosoe